Brunkhorst is a German surname. Notable people with the surname include:

Angelika Brunkhorst (born 1955), German politician
Bob Brunkhorst (born 1965), American politician
Brian Brunkhorst (born 1945),  American basketball player 
Hauke Brunkhorst (born 1945), German sociologist

German-language surnames